Surat Thani may refer to
the town Surat Thani
Surat Thani Province
Mueang Surat Thani district
the Roman Catholic Diocese of Surat Thani
Surat Thani Airport
Monthon Surat Thani, a former administrative entity
Surat Thani FC